Andromeda polifolia, common name bog-rosemary, is a species of flowering plant in the heath family Ericaceae, native to northern parts of the Northern Hemisphere. It is the only member of the genus Andromeda, and is only found in bogs in cold peat-accumulating areas.

Description
The fruit is a small capsule containing numerous seeds.

There are two varieties, treated as distinct species by some botanists:
Andromeda polifolia var. polifolia. Northern Europe and Asia, northwestern North America.
Andromeda polifolia var. latifolia Aiton [1789]. Northeastern North America (syn. A. glaucophylla Link [1821], A. polifolia var. glaucophylla (Link) DC. [1839]).

Etymology
The genus was named by Carl Linnaeus who observed it during his 1732 expedition to Lapland and compared the plant to Andromeda from Greek mythology. The specific epithet is a noun in apposition, which Linnaeus based on Johann Christian Buxbaum's pre-Linnaean generic designation Polifolia. Buxbaum in turn derived the name from Johann Bauhin, who used it to mean "having polium-like leaves". The precise plant that Bauhin meant by polium is uncertain, but it may have been Teucrium montanum. The common name "bog rosemary" derives from the superficial resemblance of the leaves to those of rosemary, which is not closely related.

Fossil record
Many fossil seeds of †Andromeda carpatica have been extracted from borehole samples of the Middle Miocene fresh water deposits in Nowy Sacz Basin, West Carpathians, Poland.

Cultivation
Numerous cultivars have been developed for garden use, all of which require damp acid soil in shade. The cultivars 'Compacta' and 'Macrophylla' have gained the Royal Horticultural Society's Award of Garden Merit. Like most other members of the family Ericaceae, they are acid-loving plants (calcifuges), and must be grown in a medium with a low pH.

Chemistry
Bog rosemary contains grayanotoxin, which when ingested may cause respiratory problems, dizziness, vomiting, or diarrhoea.

Images

References

External links

 Images at Flavon's art gallery: Flower + Fruits, Seeds

Vaccinioideae
Flora of Europe
Flora of temperate Asia
Flora of Central Europe
Flora of Northern Europe
Flora of Mongolia
Flora of Siberia
Plants described in 1753
Taxa named by Carl Linnaeus